After may refer to:

Literature
After (Elgar), an 1895 poem by Philip Bourke Marston set to music by Edward Elgar
After (Prose novel), a 2003 novel by Francine Prose
After (book), a 2005 book by Canadian writer Francis Chalifour
After (Todd novel), a 2013 novel by Anna Todd
After: A Doctor Explores What Near-Death Experiences Reveal about Life and Beyond, a 2021 book by Bruce Greyson

Music
After (Ihsahn album), 2010
 After (Lady Lamb album), 2015
After (Sammi Cheng album), 1995
"After" (song), a 2011 song by Moby

(after), a 2018 live album by Mount Eerie
"After", a 2014 song by Amy Lee featuring Dave Eggar from the album Aftermath

TV and film

 After (2009 film), a Spanish drama film 
 After (2012 film), a sci-fi thriller film written and directed by Ryan Smith
 After, a 2012 film starring Julie Gayet
 After (2019 film), an American film, based on the 2013 book
 "After" (The Handmaid's Tale), a television episode
 "After" (The Walking Dead), a television episode

Other
After... (video game), a 2003 eroge visual novel
After, in naval terminology, an adjective for distinguishing parts of a ship nearer the aft
After (art), term included in an inscription to indicate that a work was modeled on the work of another artist

See also
 
 
 Arter, eye dialect spelling of "after"
 "Afterward", a 1910 short story by Edith Wharton
 Later (disambiguation)